This is an article on Buddhist rankings. For the artist, see Yamazaki Sōkan.

Sōkan (僧官) is the Japanese system of rankings for Buddhist clergy. There are three ranks, collectively known as Sōgō (僧綱), comprising ten categories or levels, followed by a series of titles known collectively as sōi (僧位). Each of the three ranks is known by an abridged form; monks or priests are often referred to by their rank, rather than their specific title.

The first rank, sōjo, consists of three levels:
Dai-sōjō (大僧正)
Sōjō (僧正)
Gon-sōjo (権僧正)

The second rank, sōzu, has four levels:
Dai-sōzu (大僧都)
Gon-dai-sōzu (権大僧都)
Shō-sōzu (小僧都)
Gon-shō-sōzu (権小僧都)

The third rank, risshi, contains three levels:
Dai-risshi (大律師)
Chū-risshi (中律師)
Gon-risshi (権律師)

Those monks could then earn the following titles, known as sōi:
Hōin (法印) - Seal of the Law for the sōjo rank
Hōgen (法現) - Eye of the Law for the sōzu rank
Hōkyō (法橋) - Bridge of the Law for the risshi rank

References
Frederic, Louis (2002). "Japan Encyclopedia." Cambridge, Massachusetts: Harvard University Press.

Buddhism in Japan
Buddhism in Silla